The Women's pentathlon event  at the 2002 European Athletics Indoor Championships was held on March 1.

Results

References
Results

Combined events at the European Athletics Indoor Championships
Pentathlon
2002 in women's athletics